Belsonda railway station is a small railway station in Mahasamund district, Chhattisgarh. Its code is BLSN. It serves Belsonda city. The station consists of 2 platforms. The platform is not well sheltered. It lacks many facilities including water and sanitation.

Major trains 

 Raipur–Titlagarh Passenger 
 Junagarh Road–Raipur Passenger 
 Visakhapatnam–Durg Passenger

References 

Railway stations in Mahasamund district
Sambalpur railway division